Francis Alan Shaw (born 1941) is a former international lawn bowler from Jersey.

Bowls career
Shaw has represented Jersey at the Commonwealth Games, in the triples at the 2006 Commonwealth Games.

In 2007, he won the fours silver medal at the Atlantic Bowls Championships.

He became a British champion after winning the 2008 triples title, with Cyril Renouf and John Rowcliffe, at the British Isles Bowls Championships.

References

Jersey bowls players
1941 births
Living people
Bowls players at the 2006 Commonwealth Games